Still Game is a Scottish sitcom series, following the lives of a group of pensioners who live in Craiglang, a fictional area of Glasgow. The show was created by and stars Ford Kiernan and Greg Hemphill, and first aired on BBC One Scotland on 6 September 2002.

The main characters are Jack Jarvis and Victor McDade, two lifelong friends who are neighbours in Osprey Heights, a block of flats. They like to visit their local pub together where their friends Winston Ingram, Tam Mullen and Eric often hang about. Other main characters include: Boabby the barman, Navid Harrid, owner of the local corner shop, and Jack and Victor's nosy neighbour Isa Drennan.

Many of the main characters' relatives make recurring appearances in the show such as; Navid's wife Meena, Tam's wife Frances and Isa's ex-husband Harry. Jack's daughter, Fiona and Victor's son, John make few appearances in the show, but have major plot roles in the few episodes they do appear in. Other recurring characters include: Chris the Postie, Stevie the Bookie and several other pub-goers.

Main characters

Jack Jarvis, Esq.
 Appears in all 62 episodes from "Flittin'" to "Over the Hill"
Jack Jarvis is played by Ford Kiernan. He has been best friends with Victor for over sixty years and they are neighbours who live on the same floor of Osprey Heights, a tower block in Craiglang. Jack and Victor first met when a young boy named Frank McCallum got knocked down by a tram. Jack is a widower; his wife Jean died in 1991. The couple had a daughter, Fiona, who emigrated to Toronto. Jack spends most of his time with Victor, often visiting their local pub – The Clansman. Jack is shown to be slightly less smart than Victor, and more likely to be swayed by peer pressure from Winston and Tam. Additionally, he is prone to malapropisms, such as saying "discretion" instead of "desecration." However, Jack has shown himself to be more observant than Victor on several occasions—notably when, in the episode "Wummin," he recognises (albeit incorrectly) that Bert Findlay's strange behaviour shows signs of an impending suicide. Jack seems to have less of a way with words than Victor, sometimes trying to say something witty but only coming up with a one-word insult. Jack also seems to be more easily offended and quick to anger than Victor. In his younger days, Jack worked in his father's grocers shop, and was an amateur boxer. In the first episode, "Flittin'," Jack was said to be 74 years old, the same age as Victor. In all other episodes, his age is stated as 72. Jack is a stout, squat man with white hair (though it was once ginger) and a moustache. He can frequently be seen wearing a bunnet when outdoors. In a sketch on the sister programme Chewin' the Fat, his surname was given as McAlpine.

Victor McDade
 Appears in all 62 episodes from "Flittin'" to "Over the Hill"
Victor McDade is played by Greg Hemphill. He has been best friends with Jack for sixty years, who also lives on the same floor at Osprey Heights. Victor has lived in Osprey Heights for much longer than Jack, as revealed in the first episode of the first series "Flittin'." Like Jack, Victor is a widower; his wife Elizabeth (Betty) died in 1993, though in the episode "Courtin," Victor states that his wife has been dead longer than Jack's. Victor has a son, John (called Jamie in the first episode), who lives in Johannesburg with his family. Victor seems to be slightly more intelligent than Jack, sometimes correcting Jack or cutting him off when he begins to ramble by saying: "That's plenty, Jack." Of all the pensioners in Craiglang, Victor is frequently shown to be the most honest; for example, in "Cauld," Victor is the final holdout when all of the pensioners begin stealing electricity (he condemns all who participate in the scheme as thieves), and expresses disapproval at Winston's decision to fake a bad leg in order to acquire a home help. Victor is 74 at the beginning of the series, but had his birthday in "Smoke on the Water," making him 75. In his youth, Victor worked with "Babcock & Wilcox", presumably an engineer. He is a tall man, with grey hair, formerly black, and a moustache like Jack. Initially, Victor wore a bunnet like Jack's; this was changed after the first episode to a trilby hat to add visual distinction between the two characters.

Winston Ingram
 Appears in all 62 episodes from "Flittin'" to "Over the Hill"
A good friend of Jack and Victor's, Winston Ingram is played by Paul Riley. He is known for his scheming and attempts to cheat the system, usually in search of extra money, for example committing benefit fraud, or bypassing his electricity meter to make his life a little more comfortable. However, he seems to have some sense of morality, often reprimanding Tam for his meanness. In the episodes "Dug" and "Holiday," he also pretends to have a relationship with Isa to fend off the attempts of her ex-husband, Harry, to get back with her. He has several enemies, including Stevie the Bookie. In the episode "Scran", it was revealed Winston used to work in the Clyde shipyards, at Yarrows. Winston has his leg amputated at the end of the third series after his eighty-a-day cigarette habit catches up with him. He is known to have a daughter named Margaret, a son named Brian, and two grandsons, Joe and Thomas. Winston often takes advantage of Isa's kindness and soft spot towards him in order to receive free food from her. In the ninth series, he meets Winnie, a wheelchair using woman that he first meets on Tinder. The two marry in the episode "Hitched."

In the earlier stage play, he mentions a brother living in Nevada and a son who died in a car accident in the 1960s but it is unknown if this is correct with the television series. In the TV canon, he does have a brother named Walter.

Robert "Boabby" Taylor
 Appears in all 62 episodes from "Flittin'" to "Over the Hill"
Boabby (West of Scotland version of 'Bobby') is played by Gavin Mitchell.  Boabby is the landlord of the Clansman, the local pub. He is not a believer in the phrase "the customer is always right" and prefers to hand out snide comments with his pints, though the locals are not the type of people to take them lying down. He has a new nickname for Jack and Victor each time they enter The Clansman but Jack and Victor always have a wittier comeback, putting him in his place, often with the catchphrase "Two pints, prick!!".  It has been revealed that he had a brief career as an amateur porn star, where he went under the name of "Troy the Gardener." In the episode "Who's the Daddy?" Boabby reveals he has been working behind the bar of the Clansman since he was eighteen, though apparently he previously worked as a bouncer at QM Union at Glasgow University. He usually has grievances with either Winston (usually barring him for various antics), or Tam (who refuses to pay for his drinks). Although Boabby is sarcastic and mouthy by nature, he occasionally shows he that he has a charitable and honourable side, and demonstrates more respect for Isa than the other pensioners do. 

In the episode "The Fall Guy," Boabby is revealed to be fifty years old. In the last scene of the final episode "Over the Hill", Boabby is seen some years later as a substantially older man still working in The Clansman, where he welcomes the viewers to the pub.

Isa Drennan
 Appears in 60 episodes from "Flittin'" to "Over the Hill"
Isa Drennan is played by Jane McCarry. Isa is the third resident of Jack and Victor's landing in Osprey Heights. She is known as the local gossip, as she confesses in "Gairden" by saying she is a "nosy bastard" and will stop at nothing in her quest to find out the latest news. Isa works as a cleaner in Navid's shop, and she is shown to be a practising Roman Catholic. She has an estranged husband named Harry who frequently carried out illicit affairs with younger women while they were together. In the episode "Gairden," she mentions that she has a son named Colin. In "Dug" and "Hoaliday", she had a pretend relationship with Winston; although unrequited, Isa has a secret flame for Winston but her obsession with gossip and tendency to be nosy often sabotages her chances with him, as he finds these qualities highly irritating. Isa is heavily involved with community projects and charities, attends dance classes and enjoys aiding others. Winston maintains this is her way of keeping in touch with people to 'keep on tap with everyone's business.' Despite the fact that many people outwardly profess to be annoyed by Isa, she is still regarded as a vital member of the community, with the other pensioners immediately leaping to defend her if they feel she is being treated unjustly.                                         (Does not appear in "Drama" and "Saucy")

Thomas "Tam" Mullen
 Appears in 61 episodes from "Flittin'" to "Over the Hill"
Thomas "Tam" Mullen is portrayed by Mark Cox. A self-confessed "miserable bastard", he is always tricking people into giving him free belongings or buying him a drink, and is known for his unapologetic greed. (In Scottish English, "miserable" is equated with "miserly", "thrifty", or "stingy", not "sad" or "mean" as in many other cultures.) Tam enters competitions to get hold of free goods (which, much to the others' annoyance, he always wins), and in some episodes appears to be almost delirious at the thought of getting freebies. He married the local librarian, Frances Drummond, in the episode "Ring." His materialistic attitude often causes a rift between himself and his wife, but at 70, Tam became father to Tam Junior and Frances became Britain's oldest mum. Tam is a DJ at the Western General Hospital and often manages to con the terminally ill out of their valuable possessions. He tends to be Winston's 'double act' partner, and Winston is the best man at Tam and Frances’ wedding. Tam occasionally demonstrates a more generous side. For example, in the two-part episode "Dead Leg", Tam fakes his death in order to use his life insurance money to pay for Winston to go to Switzerland to save his remaining leg, which was due to be amputated. (Does not appear in "Shooglies")

Navid Harrid
 Appears in 57 episodes from "Flittin'" to "Over the Hill"
Navid Harrid is played by Sanjeev Kohli. Navid runs the local shop with his soap opera-loving wife Meena.  Navid and Meena came to Craiglang in 1975 after having secretly eloped from India as Meena was due to be wed in an arranged marriage. Navid has many witty one-liners but has to put up with Meena's constant nagging and insults. Although he and Meena spend most of their time verbally sparring, he occasionally reveals he is still in love with her and grows jealous when she goes to India to visit her sister but ends up instead visiting an old flame. They have a daughter who got married in the first series. Navid is a Muslim who laments the fact that his religion forbids both gambling and the consumption of alcohol – although in the episode "The Undrinkables" it is revealed that he and Meena are distilling potentially dangerous moonshine and secretly distributing it around the estate. Ford Kiernan has stated the name of Navid's shop 'Harrid's' is a play on the famous department store, 'Harrods.'

Eric Jones
 Appears in 56 episodes from "Flittin'" to "Grim Up North"
"Auld" Eric Jones is played by James Martin. He sees himself as "a young man trapped in an old man's body." He is often seen talking with Tam and Winston. Eric seems to have spent all his time in The Clansman or else in the local bookies. In "Hot Seat" it is revealed that he served in the fire service and the Navy. When Boabby couldn't be in the pub, Eric was often chosen to cover for him, much to the joy of the regulars. Eric dies in the series 8 episode "Grim Up North" due to either old age or the touch of Satan.  Along with Shug (below), he is one of the few characters who is played by an actor who is genuinely of pensionable age.

Recurring characters

Meena Harrid
 Appears in 27 episodes from "Flittin'" to Over The Hill
Meena, portrayed by Shamshad Akhtar, is Navid's wife. As a tribute to Maris Crane from the sitcom Frasier, her face is never seen (except for a brief moment in the final episode), and she always appears in the room near the counter. Although she seems to understand English, she mostly speaks in Hindi and Punjabi, frequently insulting the other characters without their knowledge. She also frequently shouts expletives at Navid who is the only person who can understand her.

Although she is played by Shamshad Akhtar in every series, she is played by a different, unknown actor for the 2014 live show at the SSE Hydro.

Peggy McAlpine 
 Appears in 15 episodes from "Flittin'" to "Over The Hill"
Peggy is Jack's overweight ex-neighbour. She is very obnoxious and occasionally violent, often manhandling her husband, Charlie played by William Cassidy from the first episode. Despite her aggressive nature, she seems to be friendly with many other locals, although she often becomes embroiled in the occasional feud with Isa – such as the local baking competition. She also seems to enjoy irritating Winston, especially when it comes to buying the last gigot chops at the butchers. She is known to have an 18-year-old son, Simon, who was charged with drink driving at the age of 12.

Pete the Jakey
 Appears in 13 episodes from "Cauld" to "Plum Number"
Peter McCormack (better known as "Pete The Jakey") is a familiar sight to residents of Craiglang. The archetypal tramp, Pete also has a very active imagination. Ignored by many, he seems to have always been about; he often is seen sleeping outside Navid's. A man of many secrets, it is later revealed that he was the father of the property developer who wanted to demolish The Clansman and that he may or may not work for the government. He also may be the inventor of the famous "Beefy Bake." As actor Jake D'Arcy died shortly before the writing of the seventh series, Pete's funeral took place during the second episode of that series. In Pete's will, it is revealed that Boabby gave him fry-ups free-of-charge for his breakfast and as a gesture of goodwill, had nominated Boabby for a Glasgow Good Citizen's Award.

Shug 
 Appears in 11 episodes from "Faimly" to "Over The Hill"
Hugh "Shug" McLaughlin (played by Paul Young), who has extremely large ears (earning him the nickname "Shug the Lug," lug being the Scots word for ear), seems to be a self-proclaimed expert in radios and sound waves. He was a communications officer during the Second World War and he often tells long, rambling stories about it, much to Victor's and Jack's annoyance. Despite this, due to his technological knowledge, Jack and Victor often rely on Shug for help. Shug can apparently hear through walls and across streets due to his ears. Shug has a part-time job as an overnight security guard in Delanys department store. In "Cat's Whiskers", Shug and Edith become the cover stars of Twilight Monthly magazine. In the final episode, it is revealed that Shug and Edith are now in a relationship.

Methadone Mick
Appears in 10 episodes from "The Undrinkables" to "Over the Hill"
Methadone Mick (portrayed by Scott Reid), is a young recovering drug addict who lives under a bridge and was a friend of Pete the Jakey. In "Job", Jack and Victor give him a clean-up for a job interview, which he gets at Glasgow City Chambers. However, in the following episode "Small Change", he is once again jobless. He was once seen with rotting teeth but in "Job", he acquired a set of false teeth that he unknowingly claimed from a home dentist and since then, is now always seen with them. He also briefly took on the job of being a football mascot and a lifeguard.

At the end of the final episode, he is shown to have cleaned up his act and is working at the Craiglang library, and still has his false teeth.

Chris "the Postie" Armstrong
 Appears in 10 episodes from "Waddin'" to "Gadgets"
Played by Sandy Nelson, Chris is Craiglang's local postman. Not exactly the brightest young lad, it often falls to one of the older gentlemen to explain a seemingly easily understandable situation to him. Chris seems to be a very lazy postman, and often leaves "Sorry You Were Out" cards deliberately when he can't be bothered delivering people's parcels. Despite these shortcomings, Chris is revealed to be a talented painter and decorator, managing to satisfactorily redecorate Isa's flat after Jack and Victor spectacularly botch the job.

Frances Mullen
 Appears in 10 episodes from "Doacters" To "Over the hill"
Played by Kate Donnelly, Frances (whose maiden name has been given as both Kirkwood and Drummond) works at the library in Craiglang and is married to Tam. In series 2, Winston and Tam both battle for her affections and Tam is eventually victorious. The couple marry in the episode "Ring" in series 4. In "One in One Out" Frances has a baby at the age of 64, whilst Tam is aged 70. Frances also has a sister, played by Dorothy Paul.

Stevie Reid
 Appears in 8 episodes from "Cauld" to "Hitched"
Stevie Reid (better known as "Stevie the Bookie") is another of Winston's nemeses; he often taunts Winston about his betting. He is arrogant and is disliked by many people in Craiglang. In "Cairds" he is bankrupted by Winston. After stealing Winston's winnings and fleeing, he returns in "Drama" posing as his fictional older brother Frankie. While everyone else in Craiglang falls for this act, Winston sees through it and confronts him, ultimately forcing Stevie to give him his earnings. In "Seconds Out," Stevie and Bobby fight each other for a woman named Stacey who works in the Pizza shop. Neither of them are successful, as Stacey's father is the boxer Jim Watt, who knocks both men out. In early episodes his name was listed on his shop as Stevie Barret.

Joe Douglass
 Appears in 4 episodes from "Cairds" to "Dead Leg - Part Two"
A footballer in his youth, Joe Douglass was once quick on his feet, but in his old age, he is confined to a mobility scooter. In "Lights Out" He moves into the flat below Winston since it is lower down and allows Winston to offer him assistance.

Edith
 Appears in 7 episodes from "Courtin'" to "Over The Hill"
Edith, played by Maureen Carr, is the sister of the charity shop worker Barbara. She has a hunchback, numerous moles, and misshapen teeth. She first appears as Victor's "date" in the episode "Courtin'" and is also featured in the episode "Swottin'," where she has the role of quizmaster during Bobby's quiz night. She enjoys a pint of Guinness. Despite her unflattering appearance, she seems to have no problems getting men in bed, once waking up in bed with Winston, and once more with Boabby. In "Hot Seat" she strikes up a conversation with a man as ugly as she is and they discuss past sexual encounters. In "Cat's Whiskers", Edith gets a makeover (e.g. having her moles removed and having fluid drained from her, which was the reason for her hunchback) and becomes a cover star of Twilight Monthly magazine along with Shug.

Guest stars
 As a character 
 Martin Compston appears as an electronics seller in "Local Hero" who he sells two pay-as-you-go phones to Jack and Victor. He insults them, asking a colleague for any two phones, as they are "two daft old bastards".
 Craig Ferguson appears as a retired Hollywood stuntman in "The Fall Guy", who in his youth emigrated from Scotland to California (partly mirroring Ferguson's real life) but is visiting Craiglang to catch up with old friends, and attempts to rekindle his teenage romance with Isa.

 As themselves 
 John McCririck appears on Winston's television set, giving him tips on which horse to back at the bookmakers in "Drama".
 Jim Watt appears in "Seconds Out" as the celebrity guest for a charity bottle smash at the local pub, The Clansman. He hands out passes for his gym in Shawbank.
 Michelle McManus also appears in "Seconds Out". She turns up to The Clansman as the celebrity guest but is told by Bobby that he had got Jim Watt instead. In the closing scene Winston delivers five pizzas to Michelle's house and she explains the reason is that she has just split up with her boyfriend.
 Lorraine Kelly appears in "One in One Out" on her own breakfast television show and interviews Frances and Tam after Frances became the oldest mother in Britain at 64 years old.
 Midge Ure
 Clare Grogan
 Amy Macdonald appears in "Hitched", as somebody that Boabby knew from his days at QM. Unfortunately, when he asks her to perform at Winston and Winnie's wedding, she refuses and beats him up.
 The Bluebells appear when they are hired by Boabby to perform at Winston and Winnie's wedding in "Hitched", with a rendition of their song "Young at Heart".

Other characters

Fiona
(2003-2004, 2007) - Played by Marj Hogarth; appears in "Dug", "Hoaliday" and "One in One Out". She is Jack and Jean's daughter. Fiona was born and raised in Craiglang but now lives in Canada with her husband Tony and two sons Jack Jr. and Stephen. She is close to her father, regularly phoning him, unlike Victor's son John. Jack and Victor both visit her at the end of Series 2, when Jack gives her the wedding ring that belonged to her mother. Fiona flies to visit Jack in hospital after he has a heart attack in "One in One Out". In the 2014 live show, it is revealed that Fiona was once in a relationship with Boabby.

Charge Nurse
Played by Carolyn Konrad; appears in 3 episodes from "Faimly" to "Wireless". She is a nurse in the hospital.

Harry Drennan
(2002-2003, 2006) - Played by Ronnie Letham; appears in "Scones", "Dug" and "Hogmanay Special: The Party". He is Isa's ex-husband who stole from her and disappeared. He returned six years later and Isa let him back into her life but he stole from her again and left. Harry returned for a second time in "Dug" but Isa rejected him and pretended to be in a relationship with Winston. Harry leaves Craiglang for good and in "Hot Seat", Isa finds out that Harry has died but feels no emotion.

Frank "Manky Frankie" Riley (2002–2003) - Frankie, or as he is known to the local community, Manky Frankie, lives in Osprey Heights. His flat is festooned with various items that would be regarded as junk by anyone else. He has a penchant for dismantling cars and leaving the parts lying about, especially in the communal landing.

Charlie McAlpine (2002–2007) – Peggy's long-suffering husband, often on the receiving end of his wife's short temper. Peggy often suspects that he is cheating on her, referring to him as a "whore-maister". Charlie was portrayed by William Cassidy.

Jackie (2002, 2006) - Played by Alex Robertson, plays the housing officer in two episodes, "Flittin" and "All the Best". Jack and Victor visit him in "Flittin". He pulls some strings so Jack could move in to the flat next door to Victor. He also is responsible for Winston moving to Finport on the episode "All the Best": when he realises that Winston is on invalidity benefits, he suggests a new housing initiative in Finport which turns out to be sheltered housing.

Wullie MacIntosh (2002, 2004) – Wullie MacIntosh was a pensioner who gained a reputation for borrowing things from the Craiglang residents – and never returning them. In episode "Waddin", he was wrongly thought to have died in hospital (it was a younger man with the same name) and everything he had borrowed was claimed back by their rightful owners. In the episode "Swottin'", he auditioned for the role of quizmaster, but was not chosen. Shortly after that episode was broadcast, Johnny Irving, the actor who portrayed Wullie, died, so the character was never seen again.

 Derek Fergie "the Ned"  (2002–2016) Played by Jamie Quinn – Fergie is a young boy who looks to be in his late-teens. He tried to cheat Craiglang pensioners out of their money by raising funds for the non-existent Craiglang Football Club. He was supposed to be marrying Sinead from the cafe but on his stag night, Jack and Victor tied him to a fence naked and he ended up missing his own wedding. In the episode "Cauld," his first name was revealed to be Derek, and it's suggested Eric is his grandfather on his mother's side. In "Small Change", he and Sinead celebrated their one-year wedding anniversary.

Sinead (2003, 2005–2006, 2016, 2019) The waitress at the local cafe, Sinead doesn't put much enthusiasm into her job. She was supposed to be marrying Fergie. She made a reappearance in “Small Change” and then again in "Dead Leg: Part Two".

Margo (2004) The Clansman The attractive quizmaster whom Bobby takes a liking to. He asks her out on a date, but ends up getting beaten up by her for playfully slapping her on the buttocks, which Winston teases him about afterwards.

Big Arthur (2003–2007) Another Clansman regular, often seen helping out Jack, Victor, Winston or Tam. Jack has commented he has "plenty of padding" and he doesn't seem to know the rules of Blackjack.

Mick (2005–2006) Mick appears to be a tough bloke from the rough yet clean Eagle Heights flats, and is also a friend of Tam. He was first seen during the time Jack and Victor were rumoured to be gay and later made an appearance as one of the cast for "Blightly's Hardest Boozers".

Neddy Mum (2005-2007) Played by Cheryl McCall - The bane of Navid, always coming in to complain of the state of his confectionery and asking for refunds for "Hot Mini Eggs" and chocolate that gave "Ma Wee Justin" diarrhoea. Navid in return refuses to do so and insults her and her son, and makes numerous insulting insinuations about her being a drug addict, primarily with the phrase "Git oot, you junkie bastard!"

Charlie (2006–2007) A very large man, seemingly obese, enough even to make the Osprey Heights lift break.

Joe (2002) Played by Gordon McCorkell - Winston's teenage grandson. Winston managed Joe for boxing, but was unsuccessful. Winston wanted his friends to offer Joe as much support as possible. Everyone in Craiglang thought that Joe was a rubbish boxer, much to Winston's annoyance. Joe was played by Gordon McCorkell.

Father Graham (2002) Played by Finlay McLean - The local Vicar for Craiglang who appears in 2 episodes "Flittin" and "Cauld". 

Wullie Napier (2002) A resident of Osprey Heights and old friend of Jack, Victor and Pete the jakey who dies as a result from the cold weather in episode "Cauld". He is found frozen on his sofa by Jack and Victor when they come and visit.

Barbara (2002) Played by Eileen McCallum - A lady who volunteers in the local charity shop and Edith's sister. She is attractive and has big breasts. Jack fancied her but was reluctant to ask her out because he feared it would betray the memory of his late wife Jean. Victor encouraged him by saying that Jean would want Jack to be happy. Jack and Barbara started a relationship during which Victor was left on his own. Eventually Isa told Victor that Barbara was married and Victor confronted Barbara telling her that she should not be with Jack. This brought their relationship to an end and Jack and Victor became close friends again.

Ronnie Wilson (2003) Played by John Sheddon - An elderly man, formerly a quiz show contestant on Mastermind, who took a 'goofy turn' in George Square; he stripped down to his underpants and began bawling and shouting. He was subsequently arrested. His absentee son, Norman, put him in a sanatorium. Jack and Victor visited him at the institution and he seemed fine to them. Ronnie explained that he had a dream that he was ten years old and that he was on a beach. Jack and Victor believed this was reasonable and signed their friend out of the sanatorium by pretending to be his brothers.

Mrs Begg (2003) Played by Celia Imrie. A 'home help' assistant. She is attractive and is employed to help out pensioners in the Craiglang area who have mobility issues. In particular, Mrs Begg was Winston's home help; however, she was highly suspicious of Winston's sore leg. After finding out about his deception, she banned him from using her services. However, she is forced to resume being Winston's home help after he, Jack and Victor discovered that she was having an affair with the reclusive widow, Bert Findlay.

Albert "Bert" Findlay (2003) Played by Brian Pettifer. A friend of Jack and Victor's. He is depressed because his wife, Annie, has died. Jack and Victor being widows themselves try to help their friend and prevent him from committing suicide, as they spot several signs in his pattern of behaviour of an impending suicide. He ends up having an affair with Mrs Begg.

Stewart Anderson (2003) Played by Alec Heggie - A Craiglang resident. Stewart is said by Jack and Victor to have been severely depressed. That was before Stewart starting taking an American drug for depression. Now he has the energy of a teenager and is the complete opposite of his former self. Stewart recommends the drugs to Jack and Victor.

Martin (2003) - Played by Tom Urie - Plays a local Craiglang resident in episode "Brief". He argues with his mother as she never bought any Snowballs for him. He yells: "Ya stupid old cow!" which results in an impatient Jack and Victor outside a bus stop to mock him. 

Vince Gallagher (2003) Played by David Hayman - The local mobile snack bar owner, Vince used to run the canteen at Yarrows where Winston worked, but he was very unhygienic. He made a stew, which caused Winston and hundreds of other men to have food poisoning. Vince was sacked but, years later, Winston confronted him and saw that he was running a mobile snack bar. Vince claimed that he had changed his ways but Winston does not trust him. Vince proves that he is immaculate and the builders are satisfied with his food. At the same time, Navid is away in India for his brother's funeral and Jack and Victor are running the shop in his absence. Winston takes advantage of this and along with Jack and Victor, turns Navid's shop into a snack bar; taking the custom away from Vince. Vince took his revenge by sabotaging the soup, causing the customers of Navid's shop to have diarrhoea. Winston then planted cockroaches inside Vince's van, making Vince's food appear to be contaminated. With his business and his reputation shattered, Vince broke down and drove his van through Navid's shop when the latter returned from India. Vince got out of the van and is still at large.

Billy Ferguson (2004) Although never actually seen, Billy has been mentioned more than once. It's said that Billy took a massive heart attack in his house, he was lying dead for several days, until he is eaten by his dog, crotch first, "there was nothing left of Billy when they found him."

Big Innes (2004) Played by Clive Russell. A large man who is friendly with the Craiglang locals. He is so big, he drinks four pints at a time and eats cornflakes from a soup pot. When he lived in Craiglang, he did not stand for any nonsense from neds and would sort them out. However, he moved away up north to Elgin. Recently, the neds in Craiglang have become worse than ever. Jack decided to phone Innes up in Elgin and ask him if he could come down and sort out the neds. Innes' wife agrees to let Innes go down, but makes Jack promise not to give him any Midori. Innes likes to drink Midori, but it has a strange effect on him. Jack lets Innes stay at his house and Innes sets to work. After two days of Innes' arrival, the neds never bother anyone again. Not for a while. Unfortunately, Isa unwittingly gives Innes a bottle of Midori causing him to go mental in the Clansman.

Kevin (2004) Played by Jordan Young. A young supermarket worker. Kevin is 24 and is extremely ageist. He is cocky and is a bully at heart. One night he accidentally switched off a fridge, ruining a pile of dairy products. Kevin got in a state and feared he'd be sacked. Andy, an elderly worker, felt sorry for Kevin and took the blame for him. Kevin left Andy alone ever since. Recently, Winston had to take a job at FoodFare due to his excessive spending. Kevin hassles Winston from their first meeting. Andy offers Winston advice on how to beat Kevin, but Winston ignores Andy. Eventually, Jack and Victor came into FoodFare. It was an emergency attempt to take all the bottles of Midori away before Big Innes came. They succeeded but Kevin, seeing the three old men, insults Winston. By this time, Winston has had enough. He punches Kevin and quits his job. Andy witnesses this and is glad that Winston defeated Kevin.

Archie (2004) Played by Sylvester McCoy. A reclusive man. Despite being a friend of Jack and Victor, he hasn't set foot outside his house since the mid-1960s. His reason for this is that he was evacuated during the war to a farm and was comfortable with a peaceful life. When he returned to Craiglang, it was like New York to him. In 1966, he put his boot through his TV after England's victory over West Germany in the FIFA World Cup. Because of his reclusive lifestyle, social services would visit him, making sure he was alright for food, clothes and money. In 2004, his house was to be demolished so he left his home for the first time in decades. Jack, Victor and the Craiglang locals welcomed him out and encouraged him not to shut himself in again, without success, although, they did get him addicted to McDonald's and arranged for him to be rehoused in Osprey Heights. It turned out, he had hoarded £38,000 in cash under his bed in all the years he'd spent cooped up, and had bought himself a new plasma TV with the money for his new home.

John McDade (2004) Victor and Betty's son. John only appeared once in Still Game, but was regularly referred to. John lives in South Africa with his family. He doesn't keep in contact with his father much. This upsets Victor, because he misses his son deeply. Victor is so annoyed with John, he sometimes refers to him as an "uncaring bastard". To try to get more attention from his son, Victor pretended to be ill. This news worried John so much that he flew over from South Africa to Craiglang to be at his father's side. John later discovered that Victor was only pretending to be ill and he was annoyed. Victor apologised, but pointed out to John that it was due to lack of contact. John understood he was on the wrong as well and they made up. At least for now.

Rena (2005) The lady who works in the cafe. Rena is a widow and she is having an affair with Wullie Reid, a man almost twice her age. Wullie is a friend of Jack and Victor's. They believe it's good for Wullie that he's found love, but Isa believes that Rena is trying to kill Wullie in order to keep his house. For example, Rena has Wullie working hard for her and Isa thinks Wullie will end up dying from being overworked. Nobody believes Isa until Rena comes into Navid's and buys a bottle of white spirits, a box of matches and a packet of Jammie Dodgers. Even Navid believed that Rena was going to set a trap for Wullie and felt that Isa was not as crazy as he had thought. That night, there was a storm. Wullie is on the roof of his house fixing the TV aerial when he slips and crashes through the greenhouse. Isa looks out her window and sees the police and an ambulance outside his house. She knocks on Jack and Victor's and asks them to come with her. However, it is revealed that Wullie has survived the fall, but Rena has died. Rena had heard the noise and came running down the stairs, but tripped and broke her neck.

Wullie Reid (2005) A Craiglang pensioner. Wullie is friendly with Jack and Victor but is having a relationship with Rena, a woman half his age. He believes he is really in love, but Isa suspects that Rena means to kill Wullie. Jack and Victor think it's funny that Wullie is "shagging" Rena. One stormy night, Wullie is on the room fixing the TV aerial for Rena when he slips and falls off the roof. He ended up crashing through the greenhouse. Miraculously he survived, but Rena heard the noise, and fell down the stairs breaking her neck. Wullie is devastated at her death, but takes a fancy to the female paramedic called to the scene.

Davie (2005) Played by Robbie Coltrane. A bus driver working for Dial-a-Bus. Although Davie appears to be friendly and helpful, he suffers from manic depression. This is due to his mother not being well. His mother's illness means that she only eats doughnuts from Greggs and causes her to be cranky with her son. Despite this, Davie is determined to work hard and doesn't charge the pensioners for the fares. Jack and Victor get used to this complimentary service. One day, he returns to work very quickly after being off with his depression. Because Isa had doughnuts from Greggs, the sight of this causes Davie to have a mental breakdown and he terrorises the passengers. He stops when he nearly ran over Boabby who was cycling at the time. The passengers attempted to shut him out the bus but let him in when he promises to take them to a pub. He explains his sad story and Jack, Victor, Isa and Boabby forgive him.

Thomas (2005) Winston's younger grandson. Thomas is a troublemaker, who causes grief for his parents. His mother, Margaret, warned him that if he didn't behave, he wouldn't be coming on holiday with them. This ended up being the case, and Thomas had to stay with Winston; while his parents went away without him. Winston was furious and was determined to straighten out Thomas. However, Thomas smuggled in a girl, a cannabis plant that Winston thought was a tomato plant, and invited his friends along. His friends made cookies containing cannabis, making Winston believe they killed his tomato plant. They even ate Winston's pies that were meant to be for his dinner. Winston was very annoyed and was going to grass on Thomas until he ate the cookies. Winston got stoned and Thomas was off the hook.

Chris Howden (2005) A property developer. Chris had made plans to demolish the Clansman. This news upset Boabby and the regulars. Even Navid was concerned because, if the only pub in town was to close, his shop would be next. Jack, Victor and Winston made a protest, but it was unsuccessful. Chris offered to buy them a drink, which they accepted. Chris explained that he wanted to demolish the Clansman in order to recreate the houses that used to stand there. This is because his late mother was brought up in one of these houses. He later reveals that his mother's name was Jenny Turnbull, a woman who Jack, Victor and Winston all had sexual relationships with in the past. This meant that one of them could be Chris' father. They are worried that their families would be disgusted, but Boabby believes that this could save the pub; since no one would demolish their father's favourite pub. None of the men is successful in finding out but it is Isa who susses it out when she sees an old photo of Winston's that she took. Isa worked out that Pete the Jakey was missing from the photo and he must have had sex with Jenny. Furthermore, Pete has a letter from Jenny proving he is the biological father of Chris. Chris decides to keep the pub, but renames it 'Jennys' in honour of his mother.

Molly Drummond (2006) Played by Dorothy Paul. The sister of Frances (Tam's wife) and Tam's sister in-law. Molly lives in Finport, on the coast and came to Craiglang to visit her sister. Molly didn't manage to make it to Tam and Frances’ wedding. In the past, Molly was a famous singer and was recognised by Jack. Tam claims that Frank Sinatra bought her a drink when she performed in New York, although this is probably a lie in order to get a free round from Boabby. Tam discovered that Molly was just as tight fisted as he is. Tam thought this was a turn on saying as Frances disapproves of his stinginess. Because Frances is busy at the library, Tam has to show Molly around Craiglang. Eventually, Tam decides to lay his feeling for Molly to rest since he is already married and rejects her: Molly is upset and grabs Tam's balls.

Cameron "Cammy" Hastie (2016) Played by Kevin Whately. A home dentist who is a friend of Jack and Victor. He used to be a professional dentist before he got struck off for removing four teeth from a woman who, unbeknownst to Cammy, appeared in toothpaste adverts. When preparing Methadone Mick for a job interview, Jack and Victor notice that his teeth are rotten and take him to Cammy to tend to them. Cammy gives Mick a pair of white false teeth to replace the rotten ones. Appears in "Job".

Walter Ingram (2016) Played by Gary Miller. Winston's brother, Walter is basically a funnier, friendlier, and overall better version of Winston. Walter lost his arm like Winston lost his leg, making Walter and Winston polar opposites. Walter eventually revealed that he only came to Craiglang to receive the money his Aunt Lily left for Winston.

Mrs Fletcher (2016) Played by Ronni Ancona. The owner of a residential care home that Jack, Victor and Isa temporary stay at whilst waiting for new homes, as Osprey Heights is set to be demolished. She starts off as friendly, but reveals her true nature as being stern and controlling when she confiscates the home's remote control from Jack and Victor after they "forced" the other residents to watch the programme they were watching. She also places a 9 pm curfew for the residents not to leave the home due to the residents escaping after Jack and Victor leave the doors open to go to the Clansman. Jack and Victor contact Boabby and inform him that they won't be able to come to the party at the Clansman due to the curfew. This results in Boabby, Winston, Tam, Navid and the other party guests going to the home to have the party there. The following morning, Mrs. Fletcher sees Jack, Victor, Isa and the guests escaping and discovers Navid asleep in one of the chairs. After Navid wakes up, Mrs. Fletcher tells him that the doors are locked and she has called the police. Luckily, Navid is able to escape by throwing a water cooler through the home's glass doors.

Iain Duncan "I.D." Sheathing (2018–2019) played by Bruce Morton. The new undertaker in Craiglang after the previous one, Mr McLeary, died. Isa starts telling stories that Sheathing is the Grim Reaper and that anyone he touches dies within a week. This is re-enforced by his ominous appearance: he is a tall, gaunt man who always wears a full-length black leather coat and fedora. At first, people dismiss the stories as nonsense but suspicion grows when Eric drops dead shortly after Sheathing pats him on the arm. He follows Isa home and talks to her, Jack and Victor. He explains that Eric was 85 and had a heart condition, and goes on to explain that the only reason he was following them was so he could learn more about Eric's life in order to deliver a fitting eulogy at his funeral. The name I.D. Sheathing is an anagram of Death is Nigh.

Callum Coburn (2018) played by Craig Ferguson. An old friend of Isa, who left Craiglang to become a stuntman in Hollywood. Callum returns to Craiglang 49 years later and hopes to reconnect with Isa and his old life after deciding to retire from his job. During filming for Lassie, he had his penis bitten off by a dog. He appeared to be a handsome man with short hair and white teeth, but when Isa agrees to start a relationship with him, she is shocked to see that he is actually overweight and toothless, with long balding hair. Upset about Isa not loving his true self, Callum (whilst giving Boabby a driving lesson) attempts to commit suicide by driving the car into a canal. Jack and Victor attempt to save them, but get into trouble. Fortunately Methadone Mick is able to save the four men by throwing them life buoys. Afterwards, Callum leaves Craiglang, but not before apologising to Isa for not being what he seemed and promises to keep in touch. He appears in "The Fall Guy".

See also
 List of Still Game episodes

References

Still Game
Characters